The breast is the upper ventral region of the torso of a primate.

Breast may also refer to:

 Thorax, or breast, a part of the anatomy of humans and various other animals
 Breast meat, a part of poultry
 Chimney breast, a portion of a wall which projects forward over a fireplace
 The Breast (journal), a medical scientific journal
 The Breast, a 1972 novella
 Breasts (film), a 2020 Montenegrin film

See also
 Brest (disambiguation)